John Bernard Croak VC (May 18, 1892 – August 8, 1918) was a soldier in the Canadian Expeditionary Force during the First World War and posthumous recipient of the Victoria Cross, the highest and most prestigious award for gallantry "in the face of the enemy" that can be awarded to British and Commonwealth forces. He earned the award for events that occurred during the Battle of Amiens in August 1918. A park and elementary school was named in his memory at Glace Bay, Nova Scotia.

Early life
Croak was born in Little Bay in Newfoundland, on May 18, 1892, to James and Cecelia Croak. The family moved to Glace Bay, Nova Scotia when Croak was two years old. He attended school there and then, at the age of 14, began work as a coal miner.

First World War
In 1915, Croak enlisted in the Canadian Army and volunteered for service abroad with the Canadian Expeditionary Force. Posted to the 55th Battalion as a private, he embarked for Europe in November 1915. He soon transferred to the 13th Battalion, which was serving on the Western Front as part of 3rd Brigade, 1st Canadian Division. Through 1917 and the early part of 1918, Croak participated in several engagements as part of 13th Battalion; these included the Battles of Vimy Ridge, Hill 70 and Passchendaele. 
 
On 8 August 1918, the opening day of the Battle of Amiens, and the beginning of the Hundred Days Offensive, the 3rd Brigade, accompanied by a battalion of tanks, was at the forefront of the 1st Division's advance. The 13th Battalion became held up by machine gun posts in the vicinity of Hangard Wood. Croak attacked a machine gun post and took several prisoners whom he escorted to his company headquarters. Ignoring instructions to seek medical treatment for a wound to his arm, he carried out an attack on another machine gun post nearby. He was wounded again, this time fatally, in the act, and died that same day. He was recognised for his actions with an award of the Victoria Cross (VC). The VC, instituted in 1856, was the highest award for valour that could be bestowed on a soldier of the British Empire. The citation for Croak's VC read:

Croak is buried at Hangard Wood British Cemetery, which is located 12 miles south west of Albert. His VC, the first to be awarded to a soldier born in Newfoundland, was presented to his mother at Government House in Halifax by MacCallum Grant, the Lieutenant Governor of Nova Scotia, on 23 November 1918.

In Glace Bay, where Croak grew up, there is both a school and a Royal Canadian Legion named in his honor. There is also a park, located on the site of his former workplace, the Dominion No. 2 Colliery, named for him as well. In 1992, the park was the scene of the unveiling of a memorial plaque, made of Cape Breton rock, to Croak.

The medal
In 1972 Croak's medals, which included the British War Medal and the Victory Medal in addition to the VC, were gifted by his nephew to the Army Museum at the Citadel in Halifax, Nova Scotia. The medals are now displayed at the Canadian War Museum.

Notes

Footnotes

Citations

References

External links
John Bernard Croak's digitized service file
 Legion Magazine article on John Bernard Croak
 
 Croak's Medals at the Canadian War Museum
 John Bernard Croak V.C. Memorial School info page
 John Bernard Croak V.C. Memorial School official page from Cape Breton-Victoria Regional School Board site

1892 births
1918 deaths
Canadian military personnel killed in World War I
Canadian Expeditionary Force soldiers
Canadian World War I recipients of the Victoria Cross
Newfoundland World War I recipients of the Victoria Cross
Burials at Hangard Wood British Cemetery
Canadian military personnel from Newfoundland and Labrador
Black Watch (Royal Highland Regiment) of Canada
Black Watch (Royal Highland Regiment) of Canada soldiers